Patrick Baur was the defending champion, but lost in the second round this year.

Shuzo Matsuoka won the tournament, beating Todd Woodbridge in the final, 6–3, 4–6, 7–5.

Seeds

Draw

Finals

Top half

Bottom half

References

 Main Draw

Seoul Open
1992 ATP Tour
1992 Seoul Open